Andriy Rad (Ukrainian: Радь Андрій Володимирович; born 16 March 1988) is a professional Ukrainian football goalkeeper who plays for FC Arsenal Bila Tserkva in the Ukrainian First League.

Honours
Desna Chernihiv
 Ukrainian Second League: 2012–13

References

External links
Profile on Official FC Lviv Website
Profile on EUFO
Profile on Football Squads

1988 births
Living people
Sportspeople from Lviv
Ukrainian footballers
FC Desna Chernihiv players
FC Lviv players
FC Krymteplytsia Molodizhne players
FC Arsenal-Kyivshchyna Bila Tserkva players
Association football goalkeepers